Mervin Field (March 11, 1921 – June 8, 2015) was an American pollster of public opinion in the state of California.

Biography 
Field was born in 1921, the youngest of five children, in New Brunswick, New Jersey. He grew up in Princeton, New Jersey and graduated from Princeton High School in 1938. His parents were Jewish emigrants from Russia. His subsequent formal education was limited to a few months each at Rutgers University night school, the University of Missouri and the U.S. Merchant Marine Academy.

His first experience with survey research was in his high school junior year, when in a chance occurrence he was introduced to the polling pioneer, Dr. George Gallup. Field’s first survey was in determining student preferences for his high school senior class president. Prior to World War II, Field worked for Opinion Research Corporation (ORC) and the Gallup Poll in Princeton, New Jersey.

He founded the Field Research Corporation (FRC), a commercial  consumer and opinion research practice operating locally, regionally and nationally.

He married Virginia Fallon in 1949, and later divorced. Field was married to Marilyn Hammer from 1957 until her death in 2006.

Field died in 2015, of natural causes.

Field Poll
The Field Poll was  an independent, nonpartisan public opinion news service, with a focus on California. It shut down at the end of 2016. As of  late 2009, it has published more than 2300 reports. 
It   relied  on financial support from  newspapers and television stations, the University of California, the California State University system, and various non-profit foundations, not from political candidates or interests.

Since 1956, the Poll has deposited its survey data with the University of California and California  State University campuses, to make them  available for  scholars, media, and public policy makers. It is a unique and rich archive that is used in political science, journalism. sociology, and survey research methodology courses.

References

External links 
the Mervin Field at the Science Literacy Project
The Field Research Corporation

1921 births
2015 deaths
Opinion polling in the United States
People from New Brunswick, New Jersey
People from Princeton, New Jersey
People from the San Francisco Bay Area
Princeton High School (New Jersey) alumni
American people of Russian-Jewish descent
Pollsters
Rutgers University alumni